Hoshea Friedman-Ben Shalom (1959 - ) is a brigadier general in the IDF.

Biography
Hoshea Friedman-Ben Shalom was born in Reshafim, a kibbutz in northeastern Israel. When he was 3 years old, his family moved to Sa'ad, a religious kibbutz in the Negev desert. Friedman-Ben Shalom is the son of Rebbe Yisrael Friedman, the Pashkaner Rebbe (and inherited that title upon his father's passing), and his mother, Tziporah, is the daughter of the Imrei Chaim of Vizhnitz. He is married and has five children.

Military career
Frideman served in the Golani Brigade.

References 

1959 births
Brigadier generals
Israeli Jews
Israeli military personnel
Israeli people of Romanian-Jewish descent
Kibbutzniks
Living people
Vizhnitz (Hasidic dynasty) members
Descendants of the Baal Shem Tov